Chagual Airport  is an airport serving the town of Chagual (es) in the La Libertad Region of Peru. The runway is in a deep canyon, on the banks of the Marañón River.

The runway length of 1205 metres includes a  displaced threshold on the northwestern end. There is mountainous terrain in all quadrants.

See also

Transport in Peru
List of airports in Peru

References

External links
OpenStreetMap - Chagual
OurAirports - Chagual
SkyVector - Chagual

Airports in Peru
Buildings and structures in La Libertad Region